Miasteczko is a historical type of settlement  similar to  "market town", also known as "shtetl" when predominantly Jewish. 

Miasteczko  may also refer to:

Miasteczko, Masovian Voivodeship, a place in Poland
Miasteczko Krajeńskie, a place in Poland
Miasteczko Śląskie, a place in Poland
Miasteczko (TV series), a 1999-2000 Polish TV series directed by Maciej Wojtyszko